Polyscias neraudiana is a species of plant in the family Araliaceae. It is endemic to Mauritius.  It is threatened by habitat loss.

It can be distinguished from the other Polyscias by the red flowers of its flower-spike and the smaller, longer leaf-segments of its compound leaves.

References

neraudiana
Endemic flora of Mauritius
Critically endangered plants
Taxonomy articles created by Polbot